Patricia Draves is an American medical researcher and academic administrator who is the 18th president of Graceland University in Lamoni, Iowa.

Early life and education 
Draves is a native of Rhode Island. She earned a Bachelor of Arts in chemistry from Mount Holyoke College and a Ph.D in biophysical chemistry from the University of Illinois at Urbana–Champaign in 1991. She then completed her post-doctoral fellowship at the University of Texas at Austin, where she studied chemotherapy treatment.

Career 
In 1993, Draves began her academic career as a professor at the University of Central Arkansas, where she eventually became Dean of undergraduate studies. She then helped establish a new biochemistry program at Monmouth College. Draves then joined the faculty of the University of Mount Union as vice president for academic affairs in 2006. Draves became the 18th president of Graceland University in June 2017, succeeding John Sellars, who had served for ten years in the position.

References 

Living people
Mount Holyoke College alumni
University of Illinois Urbana-Champaign alumni
Graceland University faculty
Year of birth missing (living people)
20th-century American women scientists
21st-century American women scientists
Heads of universities and colleges in the United States
Women heads of universities and colleges
Scientists from Rhode Island